Alpha-N-acetylgalactosaminidase is an enzyme that in humans is encoded by the NAGA gene.

NAGA encodes the lysosomal enzyme alpha-N-acetylgalactosaminidase, which cleaves alpha-N-acetylgalactosaminyl moieties from glycoconjugates. Mutations in NAGA have been identified as the cause of  Schindler disease types I and II (type II also known as Kanzaki disease).

References

Further reading

External links 
 

Human proteins